Kay McKenzie Cooke (born 1953) is a poet from New Zealand.

Background 
Cooke was born in 1953 in Tuatapere, Southland, New Zealand. She is of Kai Tahu, Kāti Māmoe, English, Scottish, and Irish descent. She attended the Dunedin Teachers' College and worked in the Early Childhood Sector. Cooke currently lives in Dunedin.

Career 
Cooke has published four collections of poems:
 Feeding the Dogs (2002, Otago University Press)
 Made for Weather: Poems by Kay McKenzie Cooke (2007, Otago University Press)
 Born to a Red-Headed Woman (2014, Otago University Press)
 "Upturned" (2020, The Cuba Press)
Cooke has been published in the 2020 & 2014 Best New Zealand Poems series and her work was praised in the 2007 edition. She was included in The Second New Zealand Haiku Anthology and Cordite Poetry Review. Her work has also appeared in a number of literary journals and magazines including: Takahe, "Landfall", New Zealand Listener, Sport, JAAM, Southern Ocean Review, Trout, Glottis, and Poetry New Zealand.

Cooke has published one novel: "Craggan Dhu (Time Will Tell)" 
Fiction. 
Publisher: Amazon Digital Services LLC – KDP Print U.S.A.
ISBN 9798630145512

Cooke was awarded the 2006, Dan Davin Foundation Award for her short story, ‘Where The Trees Lean Sideways’.

Cooke has collaborated with fellow poet Jenny Powell to create 'J&K On The Road Again', a project to discover and promote poetry in the rural areas of New Zealand.

Awards 

In 2003 Cooke's collection, Feeding the Dogs won the NZSA Jessie Mackay Best First Book Award for Poetry at the New Zealand Book Awards.

References

External links 
 Official website
 J&K Rolling Outrider Poetry

Living people
1953 births
New Zealand women poets
Ngāti Kahungunu people
Writers from Dunedin
People from Tuatapere
Kāti Māmoe people
Ngāi Tahu people